Kelley Becherer (born July 3, 1990, in Sheboygan, Wisconsin), is a visually impaired Paralympic swimmer. At the 2008 Summer Paralympics she won a gold medal and two bronze medals. She also competed at the 2004 Summer Paralympics and won two gold medals for the United States at the 2012 Summer Paralympics.

References

External links 
 
 

Paralympic gold medalists for the United States
Paralympic bronze medalists for the United States
Swimmers at the 2004 Summer Paralympics
Swimmers at the 2008 Summer Paralympics
Swimmers at the 2012 Summer Paralympics
Paralympic swimmers of the United States
Sportspeople from Sheboygan, Wisconsin
1990 births
Living people
Medalists at the 2012 Summer Paralympics
Medalists at the 2008 Summer Paralympics
S13-classified Paralympic swimmers
Medalists at the World Para Swimming Championships
Paralympic medalists in swimming
American female freestyle swimmers
American female breaststroke swimmers
21st-century American women